Isaac Charles Singleton Jr. is an American actor. Isaac is known for voicing the Marvel comics character Thanos in various animated movies,TV Shows and videogames.

Filmography

Film

Television

Video games

References

External links

Isaac Charles Singleton at the English Voice Actor & Production Staff Database
Isaac Singleton - Actor, Voice Over Artist

African-American male actors
American male film actors
American male television actors
American male voice actors
American stunt performers
American male video game actors
Living people
20th-century American male actors
21st-century American male actors
Year of birth missing (living people)
20th-century African-American people
21st-century African-American people
Place of birth missing (living people)